William Howard Steele (born June 8, 1951) is a senior United States district judge of the United States District Court for the Southern District of Alabama.

Education and career 

Steele was born in 1951 in Tuscumbia, Alabama. After graduating summa cum laude from the University of Southern Mississippi with a Bachelor of Arts degree in 1972, Steele served in the U.S. Marine Corps as an officer, pilot, and instructor pilot. During his service in the Marine Corps, Steele participated in the operation to evacuate American citizens from Lebanon in 1976. He later served in the Alabama National Guard as a pilot and as commanding officer of an assault helicopter company.

After his service in the Marine Corps, Steele attended the University of Alabama School of Law, receiving a Juris Doctor. After law school, he was employed for six years as assistant and chief assistant district attorney in Mobile, Alabama. In that capacity, he litigated over 100 jury trials, and co-founded the Child Advocacy Center, an agency devoted to identifying and providing assistance to child victims of physical and sexual violence. In 1987, he was hired as an Assistant United States Attorney by U.S. Attorney and future U.S. Senator, Jeff Sessions. He held that position for two years before engaging in the private practice of law.

Federal judicial service

Steele served as a United States magistrate judge for the Southern District of Alabama from 1990 to 2003.

Steele was nominated by President George W. Bush on January 7, 2003, to a seat on the United States District Court for the Southern District of Alabama vacated by Judge Richard W. Vollmer, Jr. He was confirmed by the United States Senate on March 13, 2003, and received commission on March 14, 2003. He served as Chief Judge from 2010 to 2017. He assumed senior status on June 8, 2017.

References

External links

1951 births
Living people
Assistant United States Attorneys
Judges of the United States District Court for the Southern District of Alabama
People from Tuscumbia, Alabama
United States district court judges appointed by George W. Bush
21st-century American judges
United States magistrate judges
United States Marine Corps officers
United States Marine Corps reservists
University of Southern Mississippi alumni
University of Alabama School of Law alumni